Calyptoproctus is a genus of planthoppers in the family Fulgoridae and the type genus of subtribe Calyptoproctina; records are from central and south America.

Species
Fulgoromorpha Lists on the Web lists: 
 Calyptoproctus aridus Stål, 1869
 Calyptoproctus coloratus Distant, 1906
 Calyptoproctus confusus Distant, 1906
 Calyptoproctus elegans (Olivier, 1791) - type species
 Calyptoproctus exsiccatus (Stål, 1854)
 Calyptoproctus fuscipennis Distant, 1906
 Calyptoproctus guttipes (Walker, 1858)
 Calyptoproctus marmoratus Spinola, 1839
 Calyptoproctus stigma (Fabricius, 1803)
 Calyptoproctus weyrauchi Lallemand, 1956

References 

 Fick, W. 1985. Zur Morphologie und histologie des Darmtraktes von Hyalodictyon truncatum, Calyptoproctus elegans und Fulgora laternaria (Homoptera, Auchenorrhyncha, Fulgoromorpha). Mitteilungen der Deutschen Gesellschaft für Allgemeine und Angewandte Entomologie 4(4-6): 180-183.
 Hoffman, R. L. 2004. Calyptoproctus marmoratus, a striking planthopper, arrives in Virginia from parts south (Homoptera: Fulgoridae). Banisteria 23: 48-49.

External links 
 
 
 
 Calyptoproctus at bugguide.net
 Calyptoproctus at canr.udel.edu/planthoppers/north-america

Auchenorrhyncha genera
Poiocerinae